The Chancellery of Saxony (or the Saxon Chancellery) may refer to:

 State Chancellery of Saxony: modern
 Electoral Chancellery of Saxony: historical